Salmabad may refer to:
 Salmabad, Khondab, Markazi Province
 Salmabad, Komijan, Markazi Province
 Salmabad, Semnan
 Salmabad, Khusf, South Khorasan Province
 Salmabad, Sarbisheh, South Khorasan Province